The discography of R5, an American pop rock band, consists of two studio albums, five extended plays, thirteen singles, two promotional singles, twenty-two music videos and other album appearances. In March 2010, they self-released an EP, Ready Set Rock and in September they signed with Hollywood Records. The second EP, Loud, was released on February 19, 2013, which featured the lead single and title track "Loud", the debut single from upcoming album. The band's first full-length album, Louder, was released on September 24, 2013 and the album not only includes the four songs from Loud and also seven new songs. The second single from the album, "Pass Me By", premiered on Radio Disney on August 16. The music video premiered on 29 August on Disney Channel and is available for public viewing on the band's Vevo channel. The third single, "(I Can't) Forget About You", was released on December 25, 2013 and reached number 47 on Billboard Digital Pop Songs, and the fourth single "One Last Dance" on May 29, 2014. 

The third extended play, entitled Heart Made Up on You, was released on July 22, 2014 and the self-titled single on August 1, 2014. Previously the next album, the band released two singles, "Smile" and "Let's Not Be Alone Tonight". The second album, Sometime Last Night, released on July 10, 2015 and peaked at number six in United States. "All Night", "I Know You Got Away" and "Dark Side" was released as  singles of the album.

Albums

Studio albums

Video albums

Extended plays

Singles

As lead artist

As featured artist

Promotional singles

Other charted songs

Other appearances

Music videos

As main artist

As featured artist

Notes

References

Discography
Pop music discographies
Discographies of American artists